Buell's Lane Historic District is a national historic district located at East Hampton, New York in Suffolk County, New York. The district includes 25 contributing buildings; 20 principal buildings and five outbuildings.  The district is almost exclusively residential and represent variations of late Victorian period vernacular design built between 1884 and about 1910.  Also included in the district is Most Holy Trinity Church (formerly St. Philomena's Church), built in 1894, and a two-story wagon shop built in 1896.

It was added to the National Register of Historic Places in 1988.

References

External links
Buell's Lane Historic District map (Living Places.com)

Historic districts on the National Register of Historic Places in New York (state)
East Hampton (village), New York
Historic districts in Suffolk County, New York
National Register of Historic Places in Suffolk County, New York